Bukhwamba is a village in Funyula sub county bordering Uganda.

Populated places in Busia County